Lois Griffin is a fictional character from the animated television series Family Guy. She is voiced by Alex Borstein and first appeared on television, along with the rest of the Griffin family, in a 15-minute short on December 20, 1998. Lois was created and designed by series creator Seth MacFarlane, and was asked to pitch a pilot to the Fox Broadcasting Company based on Larry and Steve, a short he made which featured a middle-aged character named Larry and an intellectual dog, Steve. After the series pilot was given the green light, the Griffin family appeared in the episode "Death Has a Shadow".

Lois is the mother and matriarch of the Griffin family. She and her husband, Peter, have three children: Meg, Chris, and Stewie, along with the family dog, Brian. Lois is often portrayed as a stereotypical television mother and housewife, despite her admitting to being a recovering methamphetamine addict and a kleptomaniac.

Role in Family Guy
Lois Griffin was born to affluent WASP parents, Carter and Barbara Pewterschmidt. It is revealed in the episode "Family Goy" that her mother is actually a Holocaust survivor who concealed her Judaism, though Lois was raised a Protestant. Lois and the rest of the Griffins live in the fictional city of Quahog, Rhode Island, which is modeled after Cranston, Rhode Island. Lois speaks with a distinctive nasally New England accent. Lois primarily works as a housewife throughout the series, though she did give piano lessons in early episodes. She has also had various jobs in single episodes such as in "FOX-y Lady", where she becomes the new reporter for Fox News Channel, in "It Takes a Village Idiot, and I Married One", Lois is elected the mayor of Quahog, and in "Call Girl" Lois gets a job doing phone sex. In the episode "Take a Letter", Lois works at the Post Office, where she sarcastically states she is "6,004th in line for the Presidency". Lois is a championship boxer which she retired from with a record of 18–0 in the episode "Baby, You Knock Me Out". Lois is also a Black belt in Tae-Jitsu, which she quickly achieved in the episode "Lethal Weapons". In one episode, Lois is revealed to have a mentally-insane and murderous brother.

Character

Creation
While still in college, Family Guy creator Seth MacFarlane created a cartoon short called The Life of Larry. The short centered around a middle-aged man named Larry and his anthropomorphic dog Steve. He made a sequel called Larry & Steve, which Cartoon Network broadcast in 1997. In 1999, MacFarlane was working for Hanna-Barbera Studios, writing for shows such as Johnny Bravo, Dexter's Laboratory, and Cow and Chicken. The short caught the eye of 20th Century Fox representatives, who asked him to create a TV series revolving around the characters. MacFarlane was given a US$50,000 budget to develop a pilot for the show, which was about one twentieth of what most pilots cost. MacFarlane claims to have drawn inspiration from several sitcoms, including The Simpsons and All in the Family. Several premises were also carried over from several 1980s Saturday morning cartoons he watched as a child, namely The Fonz and the Happy Days Gang, and Rubik, the Amazing Cube.

In three months, MacFarlane created the Griffin family and developed a pilot for the show he called Family Guy. Brian's character was largely based on Steve from the Larry and Steve cartoon, with Larry serving as the primary basis of the Peter character. The character's personality was also inspired by a friend of his father who fell asleep while watching the 1993 film Philadelphia. The network executives were impressed with the pilot and ordered thirteen episodes, giving MacFarlane a $2 million per-season contract.

Voice

Lois Griffin is voiced by producer and staff writer Alex Borstein who also voices recurring characters such as Asian reporter Tricia Takanawa, Loretta Brown and Lois' mother Barbara Pewterschmidt. Borstein has been part of the main voice cast from the beginning of the series including the pilot, and has voiced Lois from the start.

At the time when Family Guy was being developed, Borstein was working in the sketch comedy, MADtv. She was asked to audition by a member of the MADtv staff who was helping MacFarlane develop the show. She had not met MacFarlane or seen any artwork and said it was "really sight unseen". At the time, she was doing a stage show in Los Angeles, in which she played a redhead mother, whose voice she had based on one of her cousins from Long Island, New York. She took the voice of the character to the set and use it for Lois. The voice was originally slower, when MacFarlane heard it, he asked her to make it faster and higher. Borstein has noted that the voice of Lois has been changing from the slower original voice to the quicker up tempo voice of the present episodes.

There have been rare occasions where Borstein does not voice Lois, such as in the episode "Road to the Multiverse", where Lois is not voiced by Borstein in a scene and instead was voiced by Japanese actress Kei Ogawa, who was required for a scene where everything in the world was Japanese (she also did the voice of Meg for the scene).

Personality
Lois's personality has evolved throughout the episodes. She is commonly the voice of reason to Peter's shenanigans, but in some episodes she can act darker than normal and sometimes shows a taste for sadomasochism. In the episode "The Son Also Draws", Lois had a gambling addiction when the family went to a Native American casino and lost the family car. In the episode "Model Misbehavior", Lois becomes a bulimic model. However, in "Sibling Rivalry", just the opposite happens where Lois gains a ton of weight after Peter has a vasectomy and loses his sex drive. After outgrowing Peter's size, she discovers she enjoys being fat, leading to a new sex life where she lets Peter force feed her junk food so she can continue to grow bigger and fatter. "Stuck Together, Torn Apart" shows Peter and Lois splitting up because of Peter's jealousy, only to discover that Lois has the same jealousy characteristic and the two decide to live together despite their mutually jealous nature.

Sexuality
Several episodes have suggested that Lois is bisexual or, at least, bi-curious. In an interview, Borstein stated that Lois became "a little more snarky and sassy and sexual" since the first season to challenge "those sitcom rules that a woman is supposed to be a total wet blanket and not like sex and is no fun". In the first straight-to-DVD feature, Stewie Griffin, The Untold Story, Lois also states, "women are such teases. That's why I went back to men." She reveals in "Partial Terms of Endearment" that she had a lesbian affair with Naomi while they were students at Salve Regina University, and she passionately kisses Meg's lesbian classmate Sarah in "Brian Sings and Swings". In the pilot episode for The Cleveland Show, she and Bonnie make out to fulfill Cleveland's, Peter's, Quagmire's and Brian's wish. In another Family Guy episode, Lois makes out with Meg's teenage boyfriend after Meg leaves the room only for Meg to return seconds later to find them on top of each other.

Reception

Commendations
Lois Griffin ranked number 12 spot on "IGN's Top 25 Family Guy Characters". In "IGN's top 10 musical moments in Family Guy" ranked number three spot with the song, "This House Is Freakin' Sweet" from the episode, "Peter, Peter, Caviar Eater", (season 2, 1999). In "IGN's Family Guy: Top 10 Fights", Lois ranked on two places, in number seven and number 6 for Lois's fight with Stewie in "Lois Kills Stewie" and in the Griffin Family Fight from "Barely Legal", respectively.

Cultural influence

Appearances in other media
Lois has had several television appearances outside of Family Guy. She and Peter both had a cameo on Drawn Together in the episode "The Lemon-AIDS Walk" where she was voiced by Borstein. She along with the family appeared on South Park in the episodes "Cartoon Wars Part I" and "Part II". In the Family Guy parodies of the Star Wars original trilogy titled "Blue Harvest", "Something, Something, Something, Dark Side" and "It's A Trap" which are parodies of A New Hope, The Empire Strikes Back and Return of the Jedi respectively, Lois appears as Princess Leia. Lois, and most of the central characters on Family Guy, also appeared in the pilot episode of the show's spin-off The Cleveland Show. She came in at No. 85 out of 100 on Maxim'''s 2012 Hot 100. She also appears in HBO's Animals Season 2 episode, "Pigeon".

Merchandise
Lois is also featured on the Family Guy: Live in Vegas CD, and plays a significant part in Family Guy Video Game!, the first Family Guy video game, which was released by 2K Games in 2006. Borstein recorded exclusive material of Lois for a 2007 pinball machine of the show by Stern Pinball. In 2004, the first series of Family Guy toy figurines was released by Mezco Toyz, each member of the Griffin family had their own, except for Stewie, of whom two different figures were made. Over the course of two years, four more series of toy figures have been released, with various forms of Peter.

As of 2009, six books have been released about the Family Guy universe, all published by HarperCollins since 2005. These include Family Guy: It Takes a Village Idiot, and I Married One, which covers the entire events of the episode "It Takes a Village Idiot, and I Married One", and Family Guy and Philosophy: A Cure for the Petarded'', a collection of seventeen essays exploring the connections between the series and historical philosophers which include Lois as a character.

References

External links
 Lois Griffin at Fox.com

Animated characters introduced in 1999
Animated human characters
Characters created by Seth MacFarlane
Family Guy characters
Female characters in animated series
Female characters in television
Fictional characters from Rhode Island
Fictional child abusers
Fictional drug addicts
Fictional housewives
Fictional murderers
Fictional pianists
Television characters introduced in 1999
sv:Family Guy#Lois Griffin